The Saline River is an  tributary of the Little River in southwestern Arkansas in the United States.  Via the Little and Red rivers, it is part of the watershed of the Mississippi River.

It rises in the Ouachita Mountains in southeastern Polk County, in the Ouachita National Forest, and flows generally south through Howard County and along Howard County's boundary with Sevier County, through Dierks Lake, which is formed by a U.S. Army Corps of Engineers dam.  It enters the Little River as part of Millwood Lake, which is formed by another USACE dam on the Little River.

See also
List of Arkansas rivers

References
Notes

Sources
DeLorme (2004). Arkansas Atlas & Gazetteer.  Yarmouth, Maine: DeLorme.  .
The Encyclopedia of Arkansas History & Culture

External links

Millwood Lake website

Rivers of Arkansas
Bodies of water of Howard County, Arkansas
Rivers of Polk County, Arkansas
Bodies of water of Sevier County, Arkansas
Bodies of water of Hempstead County, Arkansas
Bodies of water of Little River County, Arkansas